Billy Weber is an American film editor with several film credits dating from Days of Heaven (1978).

One of Weber's first editing roles was as associate editor (as William Weber) on Terrence Malick's first feature as a director, Badlands (1973). Badlands was  edited by Robert Estrin; Weber edited Malick's next film Days of Heaven (1978). When Malick returned to film directing twenty years later with  The Thin Red Line (1998); he once again hired Weber to edit it, along with Leslie Jones and Saar Klein. While Weber did not edit Malick's next film The New World, he was an associate producer on the project. Most recently, Weber was one of five collaborating editors on Malick's fifth feature, The Tree of Life (2011).

Beyond this notable collaboration with Malick, Weber has edited Beverly Hills Cop (directed by Martin Brest, 1984), Top Gun (Tony Scott, 1986) and Midnight Run (Brest, 1988).

Weber was nominated for the Academy Award for Best Film Editing for Top Gun; he was nominated again for an Academy Award, as well as for an ACE Eddie Award and the Satellite Award, for The Thin Red Line. Days of Heaven was listed as the 45th best-edited film of all time in a survey of the membership of the Motion Picture Editors Guild. 

Weber has directed one film, Josh and S.A.M. (1993), that was produced by Martin Brest.

Filmography (as editor)
 Messiah of Evil (Huyck/Katz, 1973; associate editor)
 Badlands (Malick, 1973; associate editor – uncredited)
 Taxi Driver (Scorsese, 1976; assistant editor)
 Days of Heaven (Malick, 1978)
 The Warriors (Hill, 1979)
 Jekyll and Hyde... Together Again (Belson, 1982)
 48 Hrs. (Hill, 1982)
 The House of God (Wrye, 1984)
 Iceman (Schepisi, 1984)
 Best Defense (Huyck, 1984; additional editor)
 Beverly Hills Cop (Brest,  1984)
 Pee-wee's Big Adventure (Burton, 1985)
 Top Gun (Scott, 1986)
 Extreme Prejudice (Hill, 1987)
 Beverly Hills Cop II (Scott, 1987)
 Midnight Run (Brest, 1988)
 The Package (Davis, 1989)
 Days of Thunder (Scott, 1990)
 Pure Luck (Tass, 1991)
 Batman Returns (Burton, 1992; second unit director)
 Virtuosity (Leonard, 1995; special thanks)
 Grumpier Old Men (Deutch, 1995)
 Murder at 1600 (Little, 1997)
 Bulworth (Beatty, 1998)
 The Thin Red Line (Malick, 1998)
 Gun Shy (Blakeney, 2000; special thanks)
 Shanghai Noon (Dey, 2000; additional editor)
 Miss Congeniality (Petrie, 2000)
 Showtime (Dey, 2002)
 Shanghai Knights (Dobkin, 2003; special thanks)
 Gigli (Brest, 2003)
 The Clearing (Brugge, 2004; special thanks)
 The SpongeBob SquarePants Movie (Hillenburg, 2004; special thanks)
 The Hitchhiker's Guide to the Galaxy (Jennings, 2005; thanks)
 The New World (Malick, 2005; associate producer)
 Nacho Libre (Hess, 2006)
 Barnyard (Oedekerk, 2006)
 The Love Guru (Schnabel, 2008)
 Passion Play (Glazer, 2010)
 The Tree of Life (Malick, 2011)
 Jack Reacher: Never Go Back (Zwick, 2016)
 Rules Don't Apply (Beatty, 2016)
 The Predator (Black, 2018)

References

External links 
 

American film editors
Living people
Year of birth missing (living people)